The GLI-F4 instant tear gas grenade (or SAE 810 instant tear gas grenade) is an explosive tear gas grenade, manufactured by the company Alsetex.

The GLI-F4 has been used in France for law enforcement since 2011. It has caused several cases of mutilation.

On 26 January 2020 the French interior minister, Christophe Castaner, announced the withdrawal of GLI-F4 grenades; their replacement, called GM2L grenade, does not contain TNT, but critics such as the Human Rights League argue that it is not clear that these new grenades are much safer as they function in a similar way. The announcement was also criticized as an empty gesture since at the time of the announcement GLI-F4 grenades were no longer in production and they were already in the process of being phased out.

History
The GLI-F4 was first authorized alongside the OF-F1 grenade in French law enforcement operation, following Decree 2011–795 on June 30th, 2011. It has completely replaced the OF-F1 grenade, which was first suspended after the death of Rémi Fraisse when used during the October 2014 Sivens Dam demonstrations. The OF-F1 was then forbidden by Decree 2017–1029, on 10 May 2017.

GLI-F4 grenades are classified as weapons of war in the French Internal Security Code.

Contents
The GLI-F4's tear gas consists of 10 grams of CS gas. The explosive charge consists of 26 grams of TNT and 4 grams of hexocire (a mixture of RDX and wax).

Usage
France is the only European country that uses explosive ammo for law enforcement. This grenade has been used in France for policing operations since 2011.

Three thousand grenades of this type, some of which expired, were used on the Notre-Dame-des-Landes Zone to Defend in April 2018.

References

Grenades of France
Stun grenades
Hand grenades
Non-lethal_weapons